Albuebadi (also Romanized as Albū’ebādī; also known as Abu ‘Ebādī, Faraḩzād, Farrokhzād (Persian: فرخزاد), and Farroxzâd) is a village in Bahmanshir-e Shomali Rural District, in the Central District of Abadan County, Khuzestan Province, Iran. At the 2006 census, its population was 830, in 143 families.

References 

Populated places in Abadan County